The Mauria Pass (1298 m) is a high mountain pass between the regions of Veneto and Friuli in Italy. It connects Lorenzago di Cadore in Veneto and Forni di sopra in Friuli. The pass road, the SS 52, has a maximum grade of 10%. Normally, the pass is open year-round. At the summit, there is a restaurant. Although this is an important east-west artery, the pass road is quite narrow. Near the pass to the south is the source of the Tagliamento.

See also
 List of highest paved roads in Europe
 List of mountain passes

Mauria
Mountain passes of the Alps